HTMS Angthong (LPD-791) is a Royal Thai Navy amphibious ship based on the design of  of the Republic of Singapore Navy.

Construction and career
On 11 November 2008, a SGD 200 million contract was signed between ST Marine and Thailand for the sale of one unit of the Endurance-class LPD and its associated landing craft. The LPD would use the Terma C-Series system, which includes the C-Flex combat management system, C-Search radar suite which includes the Scanter 4100 radar and IFF, and the C-Fire fire control system.

On 21 March 2011, the new ship was christened HTMS Angthong (pennant number LPD-791) and was launched from ST Marine's dockyard by the wife of Admiral Khamthorn Pumhiran, Commander-In-Chief of Royal Thai Navy (RTN). The delivery of the ship was completed on 19 April 2012.

References

External links
http://www.koryorpor.com/

Amphibious warfare vessels of the Royal Thai Navy
Ships built in Singapore
2011 ships
Endurance-class landing platform docks